The Victoria Cross (VC) is a British military honour awarded to 78 members of the British Armed Forces for action during the Second Boer War. The Victoria Cross is a military decoration awarded for valour "in the face of the enemy" to members of the armed forces of some Commonwealth countries and previous British Empire territories. The VC was introduced in Great Britain on 29 January 1856 by Queen Victoria to reward acts of valour during the Crimean War, and takes precedence over all other orders, decorations and medals. It may be awarded to a person of any rank in any service and to civilians under military command. The first ceremony was held on 26 June 1857, when Queen Victoria invested 62 of the 111 Crimean recipients in Hyde Park.

The Second Boer War was fought from 11 October 1899 to 31 May 1902, between the British Empire and the two independent Boer republics of the Orange Free State and the South African Republic (Transvaal Republic). After a set of failed negotiations over foreigner land rights in the territories, led by Joseph Chamberlain, both sides issued ultimatums. When the ultimatums were rejected, war was declared. The war had three distinct phases. First, the Boers mounted pre-emptive strikes into British-held territory in Natal and the Cape Colony, besieging the British garrisons of Ladysmith, Mafeking and Kimberley. The Boers then won a series of tactical victories against a failed British counteroffensive to relieve the three sieges. The second phase began after British forces under Frederick Roberts, 1st Earl Roberts, launched counteroffensives with increased troop numbers. After Natal and the Cape Colony were secure, the British were able to invade the Transvaal and the republic's capital, Pretoria, was captured in June 1900. The third phase began in March 1900, when the Boers engaged a protracted hard-fought guerrilla warfare against the British forces. In an effort to cut off supplies to the raiders, the British, now under the leadership of Lord Kitchener, responded with a scorched earth policy of destroying Boer farms and moving civilians into concentration camps.

The British Government had expected the campaign to be over within months, and the protracted war became increasingly unpopular especially after revelations about the conditions in the concentration camps. Emily Hobhouse, a campaigner, had forced the British Government to set up the Fawcett Commission, led by suffragist Millicent Fawcett, into the conditions at the camps. Hobhouse published reports from the camps which told of thousands of deaths from disease and malnutrition. These reports helped to sway public opinion against the war. The demand for peace led to a settlement of hostilities, and in 1902, the Treaty of Vereeniging was signed. The two republics were absorbed into the British Empire, although the British were forced to make a number of concessions and reparations to the Boers. The granting of limited autonomy for the area ultimately led to the establishment of the Union of South Africa.

The original Royal Warrant, was silent on whether the VC could be awarded posthumously. From 1857 until 1897, 18 recipients were gazetted after their deaths but only 12 of the next of kin received the actual medal. In the other six cases there was a memorandum stating that they would have been recommended for the VC had they survived. By 1899, the precedent had been established that the VC could be awarded posthumously if the recommendation for the award was submitted prior to the recipient's death from wounds. Two such awards were granted during the Second Boer War, the well known award to Frederick Roberts, the son of Lord Roberts, and to Francis Parsons. In 1900 and 1901, three memoranda were issued for Herman Albrecht, Robert Digby-Jones and David Younger stating they would have been recommended for the VC had they survived. In a partial reversal of policy restricted to the Second Boer War, it was announced in the London Gazette on 8 August 1902, that the next of kin of the three soldiers mentioned in memoranda would be sent medals. In the same gazette, the first three posthumous awards were gazetted to Alfred Atkinson, John Barry and Gustavus Coulson. In 1907, the posthumous policy was reversed and medals were sent to the next of kin of the remaining six officers and men. Although the Victoria Cross warrant was not amended to specifically include posthumous awards until 1920, one quarter of all awards for the First World War were posthumous.

Recipients

References

Further reading 
 
 
 
 
 

Lists of recipients of the Victoria Cross by conflict